"When You Sleep" is a song by My Bloody Valentine.

When You Sleep may also refer to:
"When You Sleep", a song by Cake from their 1998 album Prolonging the Magic
"When you Sleep", a 2002 single by Longview